Some of My Best Friends Are...The Piano Players is a 1994 album by double bassist Ray Brown, accompanied by pianists Benny Green, Geoffrey Keezer, Ahmad Jamal, Dado Moroni, and Oscar Peterson.

Track listing
 "Bags' Groove" (Milt Jackson) – 4:20
 "Love Walked In" (George Gershwin, Ira Gershwin) – 4:36
 "St. Louis Blues" (W. C. Handy) – 7:15
 "Lover" (Lorenz Hart, Richard Rodgers) – 3:39
 "Just a Gigolo" (Irving Caesar, Leonello Casucci, Julius Brammer) – 5:29
 "Ray of Light" (Benny Green) – 3:51
 "Giant Steps" (John Coltrane) – 6:06
 "My Romance" (Hart, Rodgers) – 4:51
 "Close Your Eyes" (Bernice Petkere) – 4:40
 "St. Tropez" (Oscar Peterson) – 5:10
 "How Come You Do Me Like You Do?" (Gene Austin, Roy Bergere) – 6:27

Personnel

Performance
 Ray Brown – double bass
 Benny Green – piano
 Ahmad Jamal
 Geoff Keezer
 Dado Moroni
 Oscar Peterson
 Lewis Nash – drums

References

1994 albums
Ray Brown (musician) albums
Telarc Records albums